The 2019 Oceania Women's Sevens Championship was the ninth Oceania Women's Sevens tournament. It served as the regional qualifier for the 2020 Tokyo Olympic Sevens and was held at ANZ Stadium in Suva, Fiji on 7–9 November.

Australia won the tournament to claim their fifth Oceania Championship, defeating Fiji by 24–12 in the final. Runners-up Fiji, as the highest-placed side not already qualified, won the Oceania berth at the 2020 Olympic Sevens in Tokyo.

Papua New Guinea and Samoa finished fourth and fifth respectively and, as the second and third highest-placed sides not already qualified, won entry to the 2020 Final Olympic Qualifier as well as the 2020 Hong Kong Women's Sevens qualifying tournament for the 2020–21 World Women's Sevens Series.

Teams
The following nations competed at the 2019 tournament, including two invited teams – the Canadian development team (Maple Leafs) and a development side from Japan:

Format
Teams were seeded into three pools of four.

To allow a clear run for countries competing for qualification to the 2020 Olympic Sevens, the two Oceania nations already qualified, Australia and New Zealand, were placed in Pool A together with the invited development sides (not eligible for Oceania berths) from Canada and Japan. The remaining teams were seeded into Pool B and Pool C.

A knockout competition involving the two top teams of Pool B and two top teams of Pool C decided the Olympic qualifying berth.

Pool stage

Pool A (International)

Pool B (Olympic)

Pool C (Olympic)

Knockout stage

Lower classification

Eleventh place

Title playoffs

Placings

Source:

See also
 2019 Oceania Sevens Championship (for men)

References

2019
Rugby sevens at the 2020 Summer Olympics – Women's qualification
2019 in Fijian rugby union
2019 in women's rugby union
2019 rugby sevens competitions
International rugby union competitions hosted by Fiji
Sport in Suva
Oceania Women's Sevens